Giovanni Rossi may refer to:
 Giovanni Rossi (anarchist) (1856-1943), Italian anarchist
 Giovanni Rossi (bicycle racer) (1926-1983), Swiss road bicycle racer
 Giovanni de' Rossi (1431-1502), Italian condottiero and the fifth count of San Secondo
 Giovanni de Rossi (bishop) (died 1667), Roman Catholic Bishop of Ossero and Bishop of Chiron 
 Giovan Antonio de' Rossi (1616–1695), Italian architect of the Baroque
 Giovanni Giacomo de Rossi (1627-1691), Italian engraver and printer, active in Rome
 Giovanni Battista de' Rossi (1698-1764), Italian Roman Catholic priest
 Giovanni Bernardo De Rossi (1742-1831), Italian Hebraist
 Giovanni Battista de Rossi (1822-1894), Italian archaeologist
 Giovanni "Gio" Rossi, fictional character on the ABC television series, Ugly Betty